The Gran Loggia d'Italia degli A.L.A.M. (the acronym stands for Antichi Liberi e Accettati Muratori), known in English as the Grand Lodge of Italy of the A.F.A.M. (the acronym stands for Ancient Free and Accepted Masons), is a Continental Freemasonic organization based at Palazzo Vitelleschi, in Rome. It was founded in 1910 as a schism from the Grand Orient of Italy. They are a member of the CLIPSAS, the international association of liberal Freemasonic jurisdictions. They were known popularly as the "Piazza del Gesù" Freemasons, due to their former headquarters at the Piazza del Gesù, 47 in Rome.

Philanthropic activities
During the outbreak of the COVID-19 pandemic in Italy (2020), the Gran Loggia d'Italia degli A.L.A.M. made a 100.000 euro donation in favour to the Italian Red Cross.

References

External links
Gran Loggia d'Italia degli A.L.A.M. (official website)

1910 establishments in Italy
Freemasonry in Italy
Italy, Grand Lodge of
Organizations established in 1910